Kemsresthi (English: Millionaire Game) was a Thai game show based on the original British format of Who Wants to Be a Millionaire?. The main goal of the game was to win 1 million Thai baht by answering 15 multiple-choice questions correctly (earlier 16 or 12 questions). There were three lifelines, all other than in the original version - Double Dip (contestant can choose the answer two times), Help of Audience Members (help of two members of the audience who believe that they know the correct answer) and Switch The Question (contestant can change the question).  Earlier the lifelines were: Fifty Fifty, Phone-A-Friend and Ask The Audience.

The game's prizes 
These are the prizes of the new version of the game:

These are the prizes of the old version of the game:

Top prize winners

Siksaka Bunluerith is the first and only Thai contestant to legitimately win a top prize by answering all 16 questions in second format correctly in October 2000.

The Lertlak Panchanawaporn affair
In 2002, Lertlak Panchanawaporn, 44-year-old street vendor won the grand prize on the show. The show's producers were impressed with her, since she had only a fourth-grade education. Finally, the truth came to light: a computer error led to the player being fed all the right answers. The cable feeding the player the answers on the computer screen was supposed to be hooked up to the presenter's computer. She had noticed that the right answers were constantly highlighted on her computer screen and won the million by this way. The show's producers took the million away from her. Later she was allowed to play again and she won 25,000 baht in her second play-through. Articles about it were written in many TV stations, newspapers and websites (e.g. BBC and Deutsche Welle). There was also a chapter about it in the book Dear Valued Customer, You Are a Loser: And Over 100 Other Embarrassing and Funny Stories of Technology Gone Mad by Rick Broadhead.

Notes

References

Who Wants to Be a Millionaire?
Thai game shows